Máximo González was the defending champion, but he lost in the second round.

Blaž Rola won the title, defeating Germain Gigounon in the final, 6–3, 3–6, 6–3.

Seeds

Draw

Finals

Top half

Bottom half

References
 Main Draw
 Qualifying Draw

Campeonato Internacional de Tenis de Santos - Singles